The Berenberg family (Dutch for "bear mountain") was a Flemish-origined Hanseatic family of merchants, bankers and senators in Hamburg, with branches in London, Livorno and other European cities. The family was descended from the brothers Hans and Paul Berenberg from Antwerp, who came as Protestant refugees to the city-republic of Hamburg following the Fall of Antwerp in 1585 and who established what is now Berenberg Bank in Hamburg in 1590. The Berenbergs were originally cloth merchants and became involved in merchant banking in the 17th century. Having existed continuously since 1590, Berenberg Bank is the world's oldest surviving merchant bank.

The Berenberg banking family became extinct in the male line with Elisabeth Berenberg (1749–1822); she was married to Johann Hinrich Gossler, who became a co-owner of the bank in 1769. From the late 18th century, the Gossler family, as owners of Berenberg Bank, rose to great prominence in Hamburg, and was widely considered one of Hamburg's two most prominent families, along with the related Amsinck family. A branch of the family was later ennobled by Prussia as Barons of Berenberg-Gossler (Hamburg was a republic and had no nobility). Several members of the Berenberg and Gossler families served in the Senate of Hamburg from 1735, and Elisabeth Berenberg's grandson Hermann Gossler became head of state of the city-republic. Richard J. Evans describes the family as one of Hamburg's "great business families." The Gossler Islands in Antarctica are named for the family. Elisabeth Berenberg and Johann Hinrich Gossler presently have descendants with names including Berenberg-Gossler, Paus, Bernstorff and other names.

Members of the Berenberg family have founded several other companies. A London branch of the Berenberg family were prominent merchants in the West Indies trade from the 17th century and co-founded the London firm Meyer & Berenberg. Berenberg-Gossler & Partner was Hamburg's leading corporate law firm and later merged into the current law firm Taylor Wessing.

History

The Berenbergs in Berg and Brabant

The Berenberg family originates from the Bergisches Land region in the Duchy of Berg. Its earliest known ancestor, Thillmann Berenberg, was born on the Groß-Berenberg estate in 1465, and was a cloth merchant.

The growing linen industry of Brabant led Thillmann's son, Jan Berenberg (born 1490 in Gummersbach, died 1549 in Lier, Belgium), to take his family to Lier in Antwerp, where he became a burgher in 1515. He was married to Engele Segers, and they were the parents of Paul Berenberg (born ca. 1533 in Lier, died 1623 in Antwerp), who was a cloth merchant in Antwerp and who married Anna Kriekart from Everbroek. Paul Berenberg was the father of Hans (1561–1626) and Paul Berenberg (1566–1645). The two brothers married sisters Anna (1557–1635) and Francina Snellinck (1559–1642), daughters of the Antwerp merchant Andries Snellinck (1531–1606) and Françoise (Francina) de Rénialme (1539–1610).

The Berenbergs were one of 130 Dutch families that had become Lutheran during the Reformation. During the Eighty Years' War, the family fled Lier and settled in the nearby city of Antwerp (Stade). The family left Antwerp in 1585 as a result of the Fall of Antwerp, when the city was conquered by Alexander Farnese, Duke of Parma. The strongly fortified city, Europe's leading commercial centre at the time, was defended with resolute determination and courage by its citizens, but ultimately fell, and around 60% of the city's pre-siege population fled the city, fearing Spanish massacres or forced conversion to Catholicism.

Grand burghers of Hamburg

Many Dutch refugees settled in Hamburg, among them the brothers Hans and Paul Berenberg. In 1590, they founded the merchant house now known as Berenberg Bank. They were originally cloth merchants and active in the import-export business. In Hamburg, the Berenbergs initially formed part of a Dutch colony and intermarried with the city's leading Hanseatic families, several of which were also of Dutch descent (e.g. Amsinck). While a number of Dutch refugees became Hamburg citizens, Hans and Paul Berenberg were not prepared to take that step. In 1605, the Hamburg council issued a decree that gave the Dutch merchants the same rights as the burghers of Hamburg.

Hans Berenberg's son was also named Hans Berenberg (1593–1640), and was married to Adelheid Ruhlant (1611–1684), daughter of the advocate Rütger Ruhlant (1568–1630) who was ennobled by the Holy Roman Emperor in 1622, and Catarina de Greve (1582–1655). Their son, Cornelius Berenberg (1634–1711), was the first to engage in merchant banking and developed the company into a very successful merchant house and merchant bank. He forged trade links with France, Spain, Portugal, Italy, Scandinavia and Russia. Family connections of the Berenbergs were instrumental to the development, especially in Livorno and Lisbon with its colonies of wealthy Dutch merchants. Cornelius Berenberg was also the first Berenberg to take the oath as a Hamburg burgher in 1684; the family thus became part of Hamburg's ruling class of Grand Burghers.

Cornelius Berenberg's son, Rudolf Berenberg (1680–1746), was elected a Senator in 1735. By the mid 18th century, investment banking and acceptance credits comprised a significant part of the firm's activities. Rudolf Berenberg was married to Anna Elisabeth Amsinck (1690–1748), the daughter of Paul Amsinck (1649–1706), a merchant of Hamburg and Lisbon, who was descended from the Welser family. They were the parents of Rudolf Berenberg (1712–61), a merchant in Hamburg, Cornelius Berenberg (1714–73), a merchant in Livorno, Senator Paul Berenberg (1716–1768) and of Johann Berenberg (1718–1772), a co-owner and later sole owner of the Berenberg company.

The Gossler and Seyler families

The Berenberg family were merchants, bankers and senators in Hamburg for almost two centuries until the banking branch of the Berenberg family became extinct in the male line. However, Berenberg Bank was passed on to the descendants of Johann Berenberg (1718–1772) in the female line. After Senator Paul Berenberg died childless in 1768, his brother Johann Berenberg took on his son-in-law Johann Hinrich Gossler (1738–90) as a partner and eventually sole heir, as he was married to Johann Berenberg's only surviving child, Elisabeth Berenberg (1749–1822). The Gossler family is known in Hamburg since the 17th century, when Johann Hinrich Gossler's great-grandfather Claus Gossler (1630–1713) was a Hamburg burgher. The historian Percy Ernst Schramm describes their marriage as a marriage of convenience; she was not considered beautiful, but was intelligent, cultivated, kind, spoke many languages (including Latin) and became an exemplary wife and mother. She survived her husband by 32 years and after his death managed the firm together with her son-in-law.

In 1788, Johann Hinrich Gossler bought the Mortzenhaus palace in Alter Wandrahm 101 (later 21). Built in 1621 with a renaissance facade, it was one of the largest and most well known palaces in Hamburg. The building was owned by the Gossler family until the 1880s, when it was demolished to make room for the Speicherstadt.

Johann Hinrich Gossler and Elisabeth Berenberg's eldest daughter, Anna Henriette Gossler, was married to Ludwig Erdwin Seyler, a son of the famous theatre director Abel Seyler. In 1788, Johann Hinrich Gossler took on his son-in-law as a partner in the firm, and after Gossler's death in 1790, Seyler became head of the firm, which was renamed Joh. Berenberg, Gossler & Co. in 1791. He held several public offices in Hamburg and served as President of the Commerz-Deputation 1817–1818. During the Napoleonic War, Seyler temporarily moved the headquarters of the Berenberg company to the house of his son-in-law, Gerhard von Hosstrup. L.E. Seyler and Anna Henriette Gossler's children were briefly co-owners of Berenberg Bank, and they have many prominent descendants in Hamburg and Norway with family names such as von Hosstrup, Wegner and Paus.

Anna Henriette Gossler's younger brother Johann Heinrich Gossler became a partner in 1798, and was elected a senator of Hamburg in 1821. Several other family members also served as senators, with Hermann Gossler becoming First Mayor (a position equal to the federal princes, Bundesfürsten). In 1880, Johann Berenberg Gossler (who had Berenberg as a middle name) and his descendants were granted the name Berenberg-Gossler by the Hamburg Senate. The Berenberg-Gosslers were ennobled in the Kingdom of Prussia (which was technically a foreign country) in 1888 and raised to Baronial rank in 1910. The Prussian ennoblement was somewhat controversial in the family and in Hamburg, as the grand burghers of Hamburg mostly considered the nobility inferior to Hanseatic families. According to Richard J. Evans, "the wealthy of nineteenth-century Hamburg were for the most part stern republicans, abhorring titles, refusing to accord any deference to the Prussian nobility, and determinedly loyal to their urban background and mercantile heritage."<ref>Richard J. Evans, Death in Hamburg: Society and Politics in the Cholera Years 1830–1910, Oxford, 1987, p. 560</ref> As Johann Berenberg-Gossler was ennobled, his sister Susanne (married name Amsinck), exclaimed "Aber John, unser guter Name!" (But John, our good name!)

In the 19th century, the Berenberg-Gosslers were strongly involved in the industrialisation process in northern Germany and in the North American trade and its finance. In 1847, the Berenberg-Gosslers were the main founders of the Hamburg America Line (HAPAG) together with the merchant house H.J. Merck & Co., and in 1857 they were among the main founders of the Norddeutscher Lloyd. They also financed the ironworks of Ilseder Hütte. The houses of Berenberg-Gossler, H.J. Merck and Salomon Heine were also the main founders of the Norddeutsche Bank in 1856, the first joint-stock bank in northern Germany and one of the predecessors of Deutsche Bank.

Since the early 19th century, Berenberg Bank had a close cooperation with Barings Bank of London, and its owners a close personal relationship with the Baring family.

During the Nazi era, the Berenberg-Gossler family—themselves descended from religious refugees—especially Baron Cornelius von Berenberg-Gossler, were strongly involved in helping Jewish-origined friends and associates in Hamburg who faced persecution, securing the release of Fritz Warburg in 1939.

Heinrich von Berenberg-Gossler was the last family member to serve as a personally liable partner (until 1979).

In Hamburg, the Gossler Park in Blankenese is named after the family.

In 18th and 19th century Hamburg, a marriage to a Berenberg/Gossler or the closely related Amsinck family could greatly advance one's social position, as was the case with Hamburg head of state Max Predöhl.Richard J. Evans, Death in Hamburg, 1987

Wilhelm Gossler (1811–1895) was the grandfather of the painter and sculptor Mary Warburg, who was married to the art historian and cultural theorist Aby Warburg, a member of the Warburg banking family.

Joachim von Berenberg-Consbruch (né Consbruch) and other people named Berenberg-Consbruch are not descended from the Berenberg family; he acquired the name by civil name change in Hamburg in 1976. He worked for the bank and his stepfather was a Berenberg-Gossler.

Properties

Gallery

Coat of arms

The Berenbergs used as their coat of arms a bear (im goldenen Felde auf einem grünen Schildfuß ein nach rechts aufgerichteter schwarzer Bär mit goldenem Halsband, in den Vorderpranken einen grünen Zweig haltend). The coat of arms is known since the 17th century and was most likely adopted no later than the 16th century in Lier, Belgium. As of 1699, the Berenberg coat of arms was still visible in the church windows in Lier.

In 1773, Johann Hinrich Gossler adopted as his coat of arms a goose foot. From 1832, the family used a more complicated coat of arms.

Upon being ennobled by Prussia in 1889, the family was granted a coat of arms combining the Berenberg and 1773 Gossler coats of arms. This coat of arms is also used as the logo of Berenberg Bank.

Lineage

Berenberg Bank partners in bold.

The Berenberg family
The following is the male line Berenberg family, that became extinct in the male line with Elisabeth Berenberg in 1822.

1. Jan Berenberg (1490–1549), burgher of Lier, married Engele Segers
2. Paul Berenberg (1533–1603), merchant in Antwerp, married Anna Kriekhart (1537–)
3. Hans Berenberg (1561–1626), merchant in Hamburg, married Anna Snellinck (1557–1635), daughter of Andries Snellinck (1531–1606) and Françoise (Francina) de Rénialme (1539–1610)
4. Francina Berenberg (1591–1628), married Arnold Amsinck (1579–1656)
4. Hans Berenberg (1593–1640), merchant, married 1) Elisabeth Amsinck (1602–1630) and 2) Adelheid Ruhlant (1611–1684), daughter of Rütger Ruhlant (1568–1630, ennobled 1622) and Catarina de Greve (1582–1655)
5. (of father's first marriage) Johann (John) Berenberg (1622–1699), merchant, married Magdalene de Hertoghe (1619–1694)
5. Rudolf Berenberg (1623–1672), merchant, married Susanna de Hertoghe (1617–1674)
5. (of father's second marriage) Cornelius Berenberg (1634–1711), merchant, married Anna Margaretha Colin (1649–1684), daughter of Daniel Colin (1615–1660) and Elisabeth Adelheid Engels (1620–1659)
6. Rudolf Berenberg (1680–1746), merchant, President of the Commerz-Deputation 1728–1729 and Senator from 1735, married Anna Elisabeth Amsinck (1690–1748), daughter of Paul Amsinck (1649–1706) and Christina Adelheid Capelle (1663–1730) 
7. Rudolf Berenberg (1712–1761), merchant in Hamburg
7. Cornelius Berenberg (1714–1773), merchant in Livorno
7. Paul Berenberg (1716–1768), Senator, co-owner of Berenberg Bank
7. Johann Berenberg (1718–1772), sole owner of Berenberg Bank, married Anna Maria Lastrop (1723–1761)
8. Rudolf Berenberg (1748–1768)
8. Elisabeth Berenberg (1749–1822), married Johann Hinrich Gossler (1738–90), sole owner of Berenberg Bank
for descendants of Elisabeth Berenberg and Johann Hinrich Gossler, see section below
5. Anna Berenberg (1639–1669), married Rudolf Capelle (1635–1684)
6. Christina Adelheid Capelle (1663–1730), married Paul Amsinck (see above)
4. Andreas Berenberg (1595–1661), merchant in Hamburg, married Sara de Hertoghe (1605–1678)
5. Hans Heinrich Berenberg (1623–1701)
6. Paul Berenberg (1659–1712), merchant in London
6. John Henry Berenberg (1663–1701), merchant in London, English citizen 1693, married Elizabeth Lisette, daughter of Sir Richard Lisette
6. Sarah Anna Berenberg (1665–), married Sir Peter Meyer, merchant in London
4. Anna Berenberg (1599–1639), married Senator Hermann Langenbeck (1596–1668)
3. Paul Berenberg (1566–1645), married Francina Snellinck (1559–1642)
4. Francina Berenberg (1601–1641), married Johan van Uffelen (1589–1657), whose descendants include King Willem-Alexander of the Netherlands

The Berenberg/Gossler family

The following are the descendants of Elisabeth Berenberg and Johann Hinrich Gossler, the founders of the Berenberg-Gossler family. The numbers are continued from the section above.

8. Elisabeth Berenberg (1749–1822), co-owner of Berenberg Bank, married Johann Hinrich Gossler (1738–90), sole owner and head of Berenberg Bank
9. Anna Henriette Gossler (1771–1836), married Ludwig Erdwin Seyler (1758–1836), co-owner and head of Berenberg Bank, President of the Commerz-Deputation 1817–1818
10. Sophie Henriette Elisabeth ("Betty") Seyler (1789–1837), co-owner of Berenberg Bank (1836), married Gerhard von Hosstrup (1771–1851)
11. Egmont von Hosstrup (1813–1876)
11. Bertha von Hosstrup (1814–1902), married Albert Hänel
11. Elisabeth von Hosstrup
10. Johann Heinrich Seyler, co-owner of Berenberg Bank (1836)
10. Emilie ("Emmy") Seyler, co-owner of Berenberg Bank (1836), married Homann
10. Louise Auguste Seyler, co-owner of Berenberg Bank (1836), married Gerhard von Hosstrup (1771–1851)
10. Maria ("Molly") Seyler, co-owner of Berenberg Bank (1836)
10. Louise ("Wischen") Seyler (1799–1849), co-owner of Berenberg Bank (1836), married Ernst Friedrich Pinckernelle (1787–1868)
10. Henriette Seyler (1805–1875), co-owner of Berenberg Bank (1836), married Norwegian industrialist Benjamin Wegner (1795–1864)
11. Johan Ludwig Wegner (1830–1893), judge in Norway, married Blanca Bretteville, daughter of Prime Minister Christian Zetlitz Bretteville
12. Olga Wegner (1858–1943), married supreme court justice Karenus Kristofer Thinn
11. Heinrich Benjamin Wegner (1833–1911), timber merchant, married Henriette Vibe, daughter of classical philologist Frederik Ludvig Vibe
11. Elisabeth Sophie Dorothea Henriette Wegner (1838–1906), married colonel and aide-de-camp to King Charles Hans Jacob Nørregaard
12. Benjamin Wegner Nørregaard (1861–1935), war correspondent and government minister in China
12. Ludvig Paul Rudolf Nørregaard (1863–1928), wine merchant and Norwegian consul in Tarragona
12. Harald Nørregaard (1864–1938), barrister and Chairman of the Norwegian Bar Association
11. Anna Henriette Wegner (1841–1918), married private school owner Bernhard Cathrinus Pauss
12. Nikolai Nissen Paus (1877–1956), surgeon and President of the Norwegian Red Cross
12. Henriette Wegner Paus (1879–1942), married to private school owner Theodor Haagaas
12. Augustin Thoresen Paus (1881–1945), hydropower executive
12. George Wegner Paus (1882–1923), barrister and Director at the Norwegian Employers' Confederation
12. Karoline Louise Paus (1884–1967), married to barrister Thorleif Ellestad
11. George Mygind Wegner (1847–1881), barrister
9. Johann Nicolaus Gossler (1774-1848)
9. Johann Heinrich Gossler II (1775–1842) (birth year reported as 1772 by some sources), Senator, co-owner of Berenberg Bank
10. Emilie Gossler (1799-1875), married Johannes Amsinck (1792–1879)
10. Hermann Gossler (1802–1877), Senator and First Mayor
11. Johann Heinrich Gossler (1834–1876), merchant, Hamburg Consul in Boston from 1864, later representative of the North German Confederation and the German Empire until 1872
11. Hermann Gossler (1845–1908), lawyer and judge in Hamburg
10. Johann Heinrich Gossler III (1805-1879), co-owner of Berenberg Bank, consul-general of Hawaii, married Mary Elizabeth Bray (1810–1886), a granddaughter of Samuel Eliot
11. Marianne Gossler (1830–1908), married Friedrich Wilhelm Burchard (1824–1892), co-owner of Berenberg Bank
12. Johann Heinrich Burchard (1852–1912), First Mayor, married Emily Henriette Amsinck (1858–1931)
12. Ulrich Hermann Christoph Burchard (1861–1926), married Olga Juliane Amsinck (1865–)
11. Frances Eliot Gossler (1832–59), married Hermann Ludwig Behn (1820–1901)
11. Susanne Catharine Gossler (1835–), married Martin Garlieb Amsinck (1831–1905)
11. Baron Johann von Berenberg-Gossler (known as John) (1839–1913), co-owner of Berenberg Bank, married to Juliane Amalie Donner (1843–1916)
12. John von Berenberg-Gossler (1866–1943), Senator, Ambassador
12. Frances von Berenberg-Gossler (1868–1951), married Baron Hans von Berlepsch
12. Baron Cornelius von Berenberg-Gossler (1874–1953), co-owner of Berenberg Bank, married Nadia Clara von Oesterreich
13. Clara Nadia von Berenberg-Gossler (1899–), married Emmo von Specht 
13. Cornelius Johann Constantin von Berenberg-Gossler (1901–1942)
13. Cornelia Nadia Julie von Berenberg-Gossler (1905–)
13. Baron Heinrich von Berenberg-Gossler (1907–1997), co-owner of Berenberg Bank, consul general of Monaco
14. Baron Cornelius von Berenberg-Gossler
14. Heinrich von Berenberg-Gossler (publisher), founder of Berenberg Verlag
13. Cornelius Johann Heinrich Hellmuth von Berenberg-Gossler (1909–), married Irmgard Else Meyer
14. Cornelius Johann Heinrich Gerhard von Berenberg-Gossler
14. Clarita Irmela Nadia von Berenberg-Gossler, married Count Hartwig (Rabe) Joachim Cornelius Alexander	  von Bernstorff
13. Cornelius Paul Hellmuth von Berenberg-Gossler (1911–), married Maria Luise Francke
14. Johann David Rudolf Cornelius von Berenberg-Gossler
14. Alexander John von Berenberg-Gossler
13. Nadia von Berenberg-Gossler
12. Andreas von Berenberg-Gossler (1880–1938), co-owner of Berenberg Bank, married Agnes Victorina von Francois
13. Maria Nadia von Berenberg-Gossler (1908–)
12. Herbert von Berenberg-Gossler (1883–1918), Professor Dr.med. et phil., married Anna Jutta Sara Elisabeth von Mallinckrodt
11. John Henry Gossler (1849–1914), merchant
10. Ernst Gossler (1806–1889), married Mathilde Huffel
11. Oscar Gossler (1843–), married Elizabeth Gossler (1848–)
12. Emmy Gossler, married Wilhelm Amsinck (1869–)
10. Susanna Helene Gossler (1808–1893), married Senator Ami de Chapeaurouge
10. Wilhelm Gossler (1811–1895), married Margarete Elisabeth Donner, served as President of the Commerz-Deputation 1853
11. Maria Gossler (1844–1915), married Hamburg senator A.F. Hertz
12. Mary Hertz (1866–1934), painter and sculptor, married Aby Warburg
11. Elizabeth Gossler (1848–), married Oscar Gossler (1843–) (see above)
10. Gustav Gossler (1813–1844)

Notable descendants of Johann Hinrich Gossler and Elisabeth Berenberg

Johann Hinrich Gossler and Elisabeth Berenberg, founders of the Berenberg-Gossler family, have many notable descendants in Germany, Norway and other countries with names including Gossler, Seyler, von Berenberg-Gossler, von Hosstrup, Pinckernelle, Schramm, Burchard, Wegner, Amsinck, Paus, Kaemmerer and von Bernstorff.
thumb|Nikolai Nissen Paus, President of the Norwegian Red Cross

Martin Garlieb Amsinck, ship-owner
Johann Heinrich Burchard, First Mayor of Hamburg
Wilhelm Amsinck Burchard-Motz, Senator and Second Mayor of Hamburg
Hermann Gossler, First Mayor of Hamburg
Johann Heinrich Gossler, Senator
Baron Cornelius von Berenberg-Gossler, banker
Baron Heinrich von Berenberg-Gossler, banker
Baron Johann von Berenberg-Gossler, banker
John von Berenberg-Gossler, Senator, German Ambassador to Italy
Egmont von Hosstrup, publisher
Benjamin Wegner Nørregaard, Norwegian war correspondent
Harald Nørregaard, supreme court advocate and chairman of the Norwegian Bar Association, friend of Edvard Munch
Nikolai Nissen Paus, humanitarian, President of the Norwegian Red Cross
George Wegner Paus, barrister and Director at the Norwegian Employers' Confederation
Bernhard Paus, humanitarian, Grand Master of the Norwegian Order of Freemasons
Gustav and Johann Ernst Pinckernelle, insurance brokers
Percy Ernst Schramm, historian

Other Berenberg descendants
Among other Berenberg descendants are members of virtually all old Hamburg Hanseatic families, as well as King Willem-Alexander of the Netherlands (a descendant of Berenberg Bank co-founder Paul Berenberg (1566–1645) and Francina Snellinck (1559–1642)).

See also
Seyler family
Baron of Berenberg-Gossler

References

Literature
Clarita Bernstorff, Hartwig Bernstorff, Emanuel Eckardt, Change is the only constant: Berenberg; a history of one of the world's oldest banks, Hanser Literaturverlage, 336 pages, 
"Freiherren von Berenberg-Gossler," in Genealogisches Handbuch des Adels, Band 16, Freiherrliche Häuser B II, C. A. Starke Verlag, Limburg (Lahn) 1957
Berenberg/Gossler, Neue Deutsche BiographieA. Leesenberg, "Die Berenberg-Gossler," Vierteljahrsschrift für Heraldik, Sphragistik und Genealogie, IX, pp. 1–16, Carl Heymann's Verlag, Berlin, 1881.
A. Leesenberg, "Genealogie der Familie Gossler," Vierteljahrsschrift für Heraldik, Sphragistik und Genealogie, IX, pp. 17–25, Carl Heymann's Verlag, Berlin, 1881.
Percy Ernst Schramm, Neun Generationen: Dreihundert Jahre deutscher Kulturgeschichte im Lichte der Schicksale einer Hamburger Bürgerfamilie (1648–1948). Vol. I and II, Göttingen 1963/64.
Percy Ernst Schramm, Kaufleute zu Haus und über See. Hamburgische Zeugnisse des 17., 18. und 19. Jahrhunderts, Hamburg, Hoffmann und Campe, 1949
Percy Ernst Schramm, "Kaufleute während Besatzung, Krieg und Belagerung (1806–1815) : der Hamburger Handel in der Franzosenzeit, dargestellt an Hand von Firmen- und Familienpapieren." Tradition: Zeitschrift für Firmengeschichte und Unternehmerbiographie, Vol. 4. Jahrg., No. 1. (Feb 1959), pp. 1–22. https://www.jstor.org/stable/40696638
Percy Ernst Schramm, "Hamburger Kaufleute in der 2. Hälfte des 18. Jahrhunderts," in: Tradition. Zeitschrift für Firmengeschichte und Unternehmerbiographie 1957, No 4., pp. 307–332. https://www.jstor.org/stable/40696554
Percy Ernst Schramm, Die Vorfahren der Anna Maria Berenberg, geb. Lastrop (1723–61), 1957Hamburgische Biografie-Personenlexikon, Vol. 2, ed. by Franklin Kopitzsch, Dirk BrietzkeJoh. Berenberg, Gossler & Co.: Die Geschichte eines deutschen Privatbankhauses, Berenberg Bank, Hamburg 1990
Manfred Pohl, Handbook on the History of European Banks, European Association for Banking History, p. 362
Renate Hauschild-Thiessen, "Johann Berenberg (1674–1749) und seine Genealogien," Hamburgische Geschichts- und Heimatblätter 10.8 (Dec 1981): 183–186
Arne C. Wasmuth og Torsten A. Reimers, Hanseatische Dynastien. Alte Hamburger Familien öffnen ihre Alben'', 2001, 
 
Furthermore, the Staatsarchiv Hamburg contains extensive Berenberg/Gossler materials.

External links

History of Berenberg Bank

 
Dutch bankers
German bankers
German business families
History of banking
Grand burghers of Hamburg
German noble families
Hanseatic families whose members were heads of state
Belgian families
Families of Belgian ancestry